Shidhatha Shareef is the former Minister of Gender and Social Security of Maldives. She was the Deputy Minister of Ministry of Health in the President Abdulla Yameen's Presidency and Council Member of the Adhaalath Party.

Shidhatha is a human rights advocate and resigned as Minister of Gender, Family and Social Security stating that the Government is not facilitating and assisting in the reform agenda.

References

Maldivian politicians
Government ministers of the Maldives
Living people
Year of birth missing (living people)